Thatcham railway station serves the town of Thatcham in Berkshire, England.

It was served before privatisation by Network SouthEast and from 1996 until 2004 by Thames Trains.

Services
A limited number of services starting from Reading continue to Bedwyn. It is also served by limited number of intercity services from Paddington to the West Country.

These services are summarised as follows.

History
Thatcham station was opened on 21 December 1847 as part of the Berks and Hants Line to Hungerford. The station remained as part of the Great Western Railway (GWR) until railway nationalisation in 1948. After the sectorisation of British Rail in 1982 the station became part of Network SouthEast until the privatisation of British Rail. From 1996 services were provided by Thames Trains until the franchise was merged with First Great Western.

Thatcham Ordnance Depot
In 1940 the 332nd Engineer General Service Regiment of the United States Army built an ordnance depot next to the main line just west of the station. This included a number of sidings that were used for the delivery of equipment. After the Second World War the site was developed as a base for what later became the Royal Logistic Corps and had a number of steam locomotives used for shunting.

The base was closed in 1999 and its site has now been developed as a housing estate.

Current layout

Thatcham station has two platforms, one on each side of the main line. At the eastern end of the station there is a footbridge over the line, replacing the old footbridge that was located at the western end. At the western end of the platform there is a level crossing.

On the up platform is a ticket office that is open Mondays to Saturdays and two access points to the station car park. On the north side of the line west of the station is a Royal Mail sorting office next to where the ordnance depot used to be.

On the down platform is a small shelter and access to a small car park. The Kennet and Avon Canal runs parallel to the station and can be reached from the road at the western end of the station.

During 2018 the station was closed for periods as part of the electrification project bringing overhead electric cables to the Reading to Taunton line, which in turn will allow the running of the new Hitachi built British Rail Class 800 and Class 387 commuter trains.

References

External links

Railway stations in Berkshire
DfT Category E stations
Former Great Western Railway stations
Railway stations in Great Britain opened in 1847
Railway stations served by Great Western Railway
Thatcham
1847 establishments in England